Michael Reusch (3 February 1914 – 6 April 1989) was a Swiss gymnast and Olympic champion. He competed at the 1936 Summer Olympics in Berlin, where he received silver medals in parallel bars and team combined exercises. At the 1948 Summer Olympics in London he received a gold medal in parallel bars, and silver medals in rings and team combined exercises.

References

External links

1914 births
1989 deaths
Swiss male artistic gymnasts
Gymnasts at the 1936 Summer Olympics
Gymnasts at the 1948 Summer Olympics
Olympic gymnasts of Switzerland
Olympic gold medalists for Switzerland
Olympic silver medalists for Switzerland
Olympic medalists in gymnastics
Medalists at the 1948 Summer Olympics
Medalists at the 1936 Summer Olympics
20th-century Swiss people